Lieutenant-General Sir Edward Macarthur  (16 March 1789 – 4 January 1872) was a lieutenant-general in the British Army, Commander-in-chief of British forces in Australia from 1855, and an administrator of the Colony of Victoria for 12 months, following the death of the Governor, Sir Charles Hotham.

Early life
Macarthur was the eldest son of John Macarthur, and his wife Elizabeth (née Veal). He was born at Bath, Somerset, England, and arrived at Sydney with his parents in the ships Neptune and Scarborough in 1790, part of the Second Fleet. Edward Macarthur is believed to be the only passenger on those ships of whom a photograph exists, although taken later in life. In 1799, the young Edward was sent to England to be educated.

Career
Macarthur returned to Australia in 1806, and took part with his father in the deposing of Governor William Bligh. Bligh, in his dispatch to Viscount Castlereagh of 30 April 1808, requested that "two of the rebels Charles Grimes and Edward Macarthur who have gone home in the Dart may be secured, in order to be tried in due time". On Macarthur's arrival in England, he entered the army as an ensign in the 60th regiment, serving at Corunna and in Sicily. In 1809, he was promoted to the rank of lieutenant. As part of the 39th Regiment he took part in the Duke of Wellington's campaigns in the Peninsular War and in France. In 1820 or 1829 he became a captain. In 1824 he paid a visit of 10 months to Australia as an agent of Thomas Potter Macqueen. After Macarthur's return to England, he was for some years secretary to the Lord Chamberlain. In 1826 he was promoted to the rank of major and in 1837 he was on the staff in Ireland.

Macarthur retained his interest in Australia. On 3 July 1839, he addressed a long communication to the Right Hon. Henry Labouchère, suggesting that regular lines of steamers should be established in Australia to trade between the various ports. That was referred to the governor, Sir George Gipps who, in May 1840, replied that government aid was unnecessary, because a large company had been formed to establish a line of steamers, of which James Macarthur (Edward's brother) was chairman. Edward Macarthur also promoted emigration in two small books: Colonial Policy of 1840 and 1841, as Illustrated by the Governor's Despatches, and the Proceedings of the Legislative Council of New South Wales (London, 1841) and Brief Remarks on Colonization (London, 1846).

In August 1840, Macarthur protested against the regulations that people wanting to take up land in the Port Phillip district should have to proceed to Melbourne where all charts of land were kept for public inspection. He was made a Lieutenant-Colonel in 1841, and afterwards went to New South Wales as deputy adjutant-general. He was promoted to colonel in 1854.

On 5 December 1854, Macarthur travelled with the commander-in-chief of British forces in Australia, Major-General Sir Robert Nickle, to the site of the Eureka Rebellion. There they talked with the miners openly and, as a result of their investigations, Nickle advised the withdrawal of martial law. Macarthur was appointed commander-in-chief of British forces in Australia in 1855, to replace Nickle. On 1 January 1856, after the death of Governor of Victoria, Sir Charles Hotham, Macarthur was administrator of the colony of Victoria for 12 months.

Late life
Macarthur returned to London in 1860. In 1862, he was created a Knight Commander of the KCB and, in the same year, was given the colonelcy of the 100th (Prince of Wales's Royal Canadian) Regiment of Foot, a position he held until his death.

He died in London on 4 January 1872 and was buried in Brompton Cemetery. In 1862, at the age of 73, he had married Sarah (daughter of Lieutenant-Colonel W. S. Neill), who survived him. There were no children.

References

1789 births
1872 deaths
British Army generals
King's Royal Rifle Corps officers
British Army personnel of the Napoleonic Wars
Australian public servants
Knights Commander of the Order of the Bath
Burials at Brompton Cemetery
Macarthur family (Australia)